The Gymnasium Haganum is one of the oldest public schools in the Netherlands, located in the city of The Hague. First mentioned in 1327, the school is currently housed in a monumental Renaissance Revival  architecture building, built in 1907. It has around 840 students, and is one of the top schools in the country, according to a yearly survey by the Dutch magazine Elsevier.

The name gymnasium refers to the type of school, the Dutch gymnasium. This type of secondary school is comparable to English grammar schools and U.S. college prep schools. In the Netherlands the gymnasium consists of six years in which pupils study the usual school subjects, with the addition of compulsory Ancient Greek and Latin, plus extra emphasis on academic and artistic skills.

Notable alumni
Notable alumni include:
 Charles Ruijs de Beerenbrouck, Dutch Prime Minister
 Pieter Cort van der Linden, Dutch Prime Minister 
 Annemarie, Duchess of Parma, journalist and consultant
 Frans Beelaerts van Blokland, Minister of Foreign Affairs
 Ferdinand Bordewijk, writer
 Jacobus Capitein, scholar
 Carel Gabriel Cobet, classical scholar
 Conrad Busken Huet, writer
 Willem Drees Jr., politician and economist
 Pieter Nicolaas van Eyck, poet and philosopher
 Dirk Fock, politician
 Paul Verhoeven, film director
 Herman Theodoor Colenbrander, historian
 Willem van Eysinga, diplomat and jurist
 Marcellus Emants, novelist
 Pieter Geyl, historian
 Andries Cornelis Dirk de Graeff, Minister of Foreign Affairs
 Guillaume Groen van Prinsterer, politician
 Bonifacius Cornelis de Jonge, politician
 Herman Adriaan van Karnebeek, Minister of Foreign Affairs
 Eelco van Kleffens, Minister of Foreign Affairs and diplomat
 H. G. van de Sande Bakhuyzen, astronomer

See also
List of the oldest schools in the world

External links
  Gymnasium Haganum

1394 establishments in Europe
Educational institutions established in the 14th century
Gymnasiums in the Netherlands
Schools in The Hague
This article incorporates information from the Dutch Wikipedia article on this subject.